Behdad Nejatbakhshe, better known by his stage name Uppermost, is a French electronic music producer and multi-instrumentalist based in Paris, France.

Career

Uppermost started producing music using FL Studio at the age of 17. His music has been released by Sony BMG, Ministry of Sound, BugEyed Records, Starlight Records, and his own label, Uppwind. His song "Equivocal" reached 3rd place in the Beatport electro-house chart in 2009 and in 2011 his Biscuit Factory EP ranked 1st on the JunoDownload electro-house chart. Uppermost has remixed Daft Punk, deadmau5, Burial, Crystal Castles, Johnathan Coulton, Syl Johnson, Congorock, Gregor Tresher, Cyberpunkers, OniMe, Jesus Luz, Spencer & Hill and Felguk. He has been playlisted by artists such as Tiësto, Armin van Buuren and Steve Angello and remixed by the popular Swedish dance duo Dada Life. In 2010, Uppermost released 41 tracks for free on his MySpace page under the aliases Uppermost, Alonely and Downed. Uppermost is currently working to promote his record label, Uppwind. His goal is to "...create a network where people can share art with each other; an artistic community where all talents can meet and learn from each other." Uppermost's idea to create music came from "an urge to express what I (Uppermost) felt at the time, some kind of nostalgia, music seemed to be the only language to translate this emotion."

On 19 September 2011, Uppermost released his debut album, Action, on his own label, Uppwind. It was made available for purchase on Beatport and Amazon on 28 November. On 19 December 2011, he released his second album, Polis, for free on his Uppwind blog, just two months after the release of Action. Uppermost began performing at live events in early 2012, starting with his gig at Alte Kaserne in Zurich.
He made his first French radio interview on a student's radio named CommonWave on 21 January 2012 with Steige and Zach Mayer.

Influences
He cites Burial and Daft Punk as some of his greatest influences.

Discography

Studio albums

Compilation albums

Extended plays
 Daily Clouds EP (2008)
 Funk EP (2008)
 Uncontrollable EP (with Yoann Feynman) (2008)
 Cake Shop EP (2009)
 Off Stage EP(2009)
 Punch EP (2009)
 Mainstreaminization EP (2010)
 Biscuit Factory EP (2011)
 A Fallen Soul (2011)
 Method of Noise EP (2011)
 System32 EP (2011)
 Underground Life EP (2011)
 Life Is a Fight (2012)
 Hidden Poetry (2013)
 New Moon (2015)
 Impact (2016)
 Origins (2011 – 2016) (The Remixes) (2017)
 Pure (with Juani) (2019)
 Night Walk (2019)
 Overnight (2020)

Singles

Samples
2012: Flow 
2012: Passion 
2012: True 
2012: Independent 
2012: Beautiful Light 
2013: Discover Life

Remixes
2007: Kevin Tandarsen – Moria
2008: Cyberpunkers – Is Alternative
2008: Missy Jay – Nobody's Perfect
2009: Disco Bitch – C'est Beau La Bourgeoisie (Kevin Tandarsen & Uppermost Remix)
2009: Greenpower featuring Ely Morelli – What Is Love?
2009: Nina Martine – Kick It
2009: OniMe – Close Your Eyes
2010: Swen Weber & Jewelz – Memory
2010: Spencer & Hill – 303
2010: Sebastien Szade & Eddine.B – Pyramid of Kheops
2010: deadmau5 – Complications [unreleased]
2010: Jesus Luz – Around the World
2010: deadmau5 – Jaded
2010: Squeeeze! – Doop
2010: Felguk – Side By Side
2010: Daft Punk – Technologic
2010: Rene Rodrigezz featuring Sivana Reese – More & More
2010: Syl Johnson – I'm Talking About Freedom
2010: Jonathan Coulton – Still Alive
2010: Burial – Archangel
2010: Fatboy Slim – Star 69 [unreleased]
2011: OniMe – Elsewhere
2011: Crystal Castles – Vietnam
2011: Keane – He Used To Be a Lovely Boy
2011: Burial – Forgive & Street Halo
2011: Dada Life – Happy Violence
2012: Sebastien Benett – Slap
2012: Lemaitre – Appreciate
2013: Futurecop! featuring Cavaliers of Fun – Atlantis 1997
2013: Camo & Krooked featuring Ian Shaw – Move Around
2014: Daft Punk – Face to Face
2014: Röyksopp – Poor Leno
2015: Phoenix – Bourgeois
2015: Adele – Hello
2015: Modjo – Lady
2015: Christine and The Queens – Saint Claude
2016: Olga Kouklaki – Oxytocin
2016: Rihanna – Work
2016: Halsey – Haunting
2017: Flyboy featuring Radiochaser – Run Away With Me
2017: Xavier Boyer – Stockholm Syndrome
2018: SKYGGE feat. The Pirouettes – One Note Samba
2018: SACRE – Forever Young
2019: Uppermost – Pure [with Popiche]
2019: The Midnight – Shadows
2020: Midnight Kids featuring Lisa Goe – Break Away
2020: Gareth Emery – Way To You
2021: Alex Bone feat. Nile Rodgers - In Dream

References

Living people
French dance musicians
Electro house musicians
Musicians from Paris
French electronic musicians
Remixers
Club DJs
French DJs
Electronic dance music DJs
Year of birth missing (living people)